Ogar Siamupangila (born 1 September 1988) is a Zambian badminton player. She was the bronze medalist at the 2007 All-Africa Games in the mixed doubles event partnered with Eli Mambwe. Siamupangila represented her country at the 2006, 2010 and 2018 Commonwealth Games.

Achievements

All-Africa Games 
Mixed doubles

African Championships 
Mixed doubles

BWF International Challenge/Series (9 titles, 20 runners-up) 
Women's singles

Women's doubles

Mixed doubles

  BWF International Challenge tournament
  BWF International Series tournament
  BWF Future Series tournament

Personal life 
Siamupangila's sister, Evelyn, is also a professional badminton player.

References

External links 
 

1988 births
Living people
People from Kitwe
Zambian female badminton players
Badminton players at the 2006 Commonwealth Games
Badminton players at the 2010 Commonwealth Games
Badminton players at the 2018 Commonwealth Games
Badminton players at the 2022 Commonwealth Games
Commonwealth Games competitors for Zambia
Competitors at the 2007 All-Africa Games
Competitors at the 2019 African Games
African Games bronze medalists for Zambia
African Games medalists in badminton